J. B. Wright House is a historic house in Kingman, Arizona. The house was built in 1912 in the Neo-Colonial Revival style. The house was built with native stone. The house is next door to the Mohave County Court House. Mr. Wright was a civil engineer and contractor, who help in building the Mohave County Court House 1914–15. He owned the house until his death in 1944. The house is on the National Register of Historic Places.

It was evaluated for National Register listing as part of a 1985 study of 63 historic resources in Kingman that led to this and many others being listed.

References

Colonial Revival architecture in Arizona
Houses completed in 1912
Houses in Kingman, Arizona
Houses on the National Register of Historic Places in Arizona
1912 establishments in Arizona
National Register of Historic Places in Kingman, Arizona